The 1938 Bowling Green Falcons football team was an American football team that represented Bowling Green State College (later renamed Bowling Green State University) in the Ohio Athletic Conference (OAC) during the 1938 college football season. In their fourth season under head coach Harry Ockerman, the Cardinals compiled a 3–2–3 record (2–2–2 against OAC opponents), finished in eleventh place out of 19 teams in the OAC, and outscored opponents by a total of 95 to 41. Wayne Stewart was the team captain. The team played its home games at University Stadium in Bowling Green, Ohio.

Schedule

References

Bowling Green
Bowling Green Falcons football seasons
Bowling Green Falcons football